Zufari: Ride into Africa (officially stylized as ZUFARI: Ride into Africa!) is an off-road safari trail jeep ride at Chessington World of Adventures, a zoo and theme park in London.  A 22-acre site landscaped to look like an African reserve, it is home to animals such as giraffes, white rhinos, ostriches, blesbok, nile lechwe and more.

Ride history

Construction
In 2009, planning started for a five-year development plan, which would give the resort a 'Wild Adventure' brand image. The plan to do this would run from 2010 until 2015 and included a Safari Attraction behind the hotels. Wild Asia was the first major installment and opened in 2010 as part of the re-branding, two years later in 2012 ToyTown was re-themed and plans for Zufari were submitted. They were later approved and construction of the landscape began in September 2012.

As part of the investment, the pre-existing Flying Jumbos were relocated to the area to add attractions to the new themed land.

Part of the site home to Zufari began with the opening of the Wanyama Reserve in June 2010, which is an African themed zoo area. In March 2013, Chessington opened the Zufari area with the complete African landscape, merging the Wanyama reserve and Zufari into one.

Promotion
Zufari was the focus point of the park in 2013, with adverts for the ride appearing on national television for the span of the 2013 season. During construction, a mini-site for the ride was launched on the park's website, detailing the plans for the attraction as well as the animals it would include. During the African Adventures event before launch of the ride, one of its trucks was on display in the zoo, with notices up telling guests to "embark in 2013". Several videos regarding animal transportation and landscape construction also appeared online.

In the Summer of 2013, Chessington created a PR stunt to gain the ride more attention. It involved banning animal print clothing being worn by guests on Zufari. The stunt proved successful, and the summer season was one of the busiest since 2008. The banning rule was not enforced.

Description

The ride is themed around an African Conservation team called A.C.R.E (standing for 'African Conservation Research and Exploration') who have discovered a new area within Africa, which they have named 'ZUFARI'.

The ride takes guests through the terrain of the Zufari reserve and shows the animals that it houses, with commentary from 'Chase Van-Driver' an A.C.R.E researcher. Towards the end of the ride, near the rhinos, a tree blocks the path meaning that the truck needs to take a separate route through a "dangerous cave", a water effects feature, including the vehicle driving through a waterfall. Whilst there is a roof, passengers sitting on the edges of the row are liable to get wet.

Gallery

See also
 Chessington Zoo

References

External links

 

2013 establishments in England
Chessington World of Adventures rides
Amusement rides introduced in 2013
Fictional rhinoceroses
Fictional giraffes